Our Lady of Mount Carmel Grotto is a national historic district located at 36 Amity Street in Rosebank, Staten Island, New York.  It is a historic Roman Catholic grotto designed and constructed by the local Italian American community.  Work on the distinctive concrete and stone folk art structure was begun in 1937 and continues to the present.  The property includes the grotto, a frame meeting hall dated to about 1920, and contributing landscape features and ancillary structures and objects.

It was added to the National Register of Historic Places in 2000.

References

External links
Grotto of Our Lady of Mount Carmel website

Properties of religious function on the National Register of Historic Places in Staten Island
Historic districts in Staten Island